In the United States, a registered nurse certified in low-risk neonatal nursing (RNC-LRN) is a neonatal nurse who has earned nursing board certification from the National Certification Corporation in low-risk neonatal nursing.

See also

List of nursing credentials

External links
National Certification Corporation website

Nursing credentials and certifications
Neonatology